

Events

Pre-1600
356 BC – The Temple of Artemis in Ephesus, one of the Seven Wonders of the World, is destroyed by arson.
 230 – Pope Pontian succeeds Urban I as the eighteenth pope. After being exiled to Sardinia, he became the first pope to resign his office.
 285 – Diocletian appoints Maximian as Caesar and co-ruler.
365 – The 365 Crete earthquake affected the Greek island of Crete with a maximum Mercalli intensity of XI (Extreme), causing a destructive tsunami that affects the coasts of Libya and Egypt, especially Alexandria. Many thousands were killed.
 905 – King Berengar I of Italy and a hired Hungarian army defeats the Frankish forces at Verona. King Louis III is captured and blinded for breaking his oath (see 902).
1242 – Battle of Taillebourg: Louis IX of France puts an end to the revolt of his vassals Henry III of England and Hugh X of Lusignan.
1403 – Battle of Shrewsbury: King Henry IV of England defeats rebels to the north of the county town of Shropshire, England.
1545 – The first landing of French troops on the coast of the Isle of Wight during the French invasion of the Isle of Wight.
1568 – Eighty Years' War: Battle of Jemmingen: Fernando Álvarez de Toledo, Duke of Alva defeats Louis of Nassau.

1601–1900
1645 – Qing dynasty regent Dorgon issues an edict ordering all Han Chinese men to shave their forehead and braid the rest of their hair into a queue identical to those of the Manchus.
1656 – The Raid on Málaga takes place during the Anglo-Spanish War.
1674 – A Dutch assault on the French island of Martinique is repulsed against all odds.
1718 – The Treaty of Passarowitz between the Ottoman Empire, Austria and the Republic of Venice is signed.
1774 – Russo-Turkish War (1768–74): Russia and the Ottoman Empire sign the Treaty of Küçük Kaynarca ending the war.
1798 – French campaign in Egypt and Syria: Napoleon's forces defeat an Ottoman-Mamluk army near Cairo in the Battle of the Pyramids.
1831 – Inauguration of Leopold I of Belgium, first king of the Belgians.
1861 – American Civil War: First Battle of Bull Run: At Manassas Junction, Virginia, the first major battle of the war begins and ends in a victory for the Confederate army.
1865 – In the market square of Springfield, Missouri, Wild Bill Hickok shoots and kills Davis Tutt in what is regarded as the first western showdown.
1873 – At Adair, Iowa, Jesse James and the James–Younger Gang pull off the first successful train robbery in the American Old West.
1877 – After rioting by Baltimore and Ohio Railroad workers and the deaths of nine rail workers at the hands of the Maryland militia, workers in Pittsburgh, Pennsylvania, stage a sympathy strike that is met with an assault by the state militia.

1901–present
1904 – Louis Rigolly, a Frenchman, becomes the first man to break the  barrier on land. He drove a 15-liter Gobron-Brillié in Ostend, Belgium.
1907 – The passenger steamer SS Columbia sinks after colliding with the steam schooner San Pedro off Shelter Cove, California, killing 88 people.
1919 – The dirigible Wingfoot Air Express crashes into the Illinois Trust and Savings Building in Chicago, killing 12 people.
1920 – The Belfast Pogrom begins with the one day removal of thousands of Belfast shipyard, factory and mill workers from their jobs.  
1925 – Scopes Trial: In Dayton, Tennessee, high school biology teacher John T. Scopes is found guilty of teaching human evolution in class and fined $100.
  1925   – Malcolm Campbell becomes the first man to exceed  on land.
1936 – Spanish Civil War: The Central Committee of Antifascist Militias of Catalonia is constituted, establishing an anarcho-syndicalist economy in Catalonia.
1944 – World War II: Battle of Guam: American troops land on Guam, starting a battle that will end on August 10.
  1944   – World War II: Claus von Stauffenberg and four fellow conspirators are executed for the July 20 plot to assassinate Adolf Hitler.
1949 – The United States Senate ratifies the North Atlantic Treaty.
1952 – The 7.3  Kern County earthquake strikes Southern California with a maximum Mercalli intensity of XI (Extreme), killing 12 and injuring hundreds. 
1954 – First Indochina War: The Geneva Conference partitions Vietnam into North Vietnam and South Vietnam.
1959 – , the first nuclear-powered cargo-passenger ship, is launched as a showcase for Dwight D. Eisenhower's "Atoms for Peace" initiative.
  1959   – Elijah Jerry "Pumpsie" Green becomes the first African-American to play for the Boston Red Sox, the last team to integrate. He came in as a pinch runner for Vic Wertz and stayed in as shortstop in a 2–1 loss to the Chicago White Sox.
1960 – Sirimavo Bandaranaike is elected Prime Minister of Sri Lanka, becoming the world's first female head of government
1961 – Mercury program: Mercury-Redstone 4 Mission: Gus Grissom piloting Liberty Bell 7 becomes the second American to go into space (in a suborbital mission).
  1961   – Alaska Airlines Flight 779 crashes near Shemya Air Force Base in Shemya, Alaska killing six.
1964 – A series of racial riots break out in Singapore. In the next six weeks, 23 die with 454 others injured.
1969 – Apollo program: At 02:56 UTC, astronaut Neil Armstrong becomes the first person to walk on the Moon, followed 19 minutes later by Edwin "Buzz" Aldrin.
1970 – After 11 years of construction, the Aswan High Dam in Egypt is completed.
1972 – The Troubles: Bloody Friday: The Provisional IRA detonate 22 bombs in central Belfast, Northern Ireland, United Kingdom in the space of 80 minutes, killing nine and injuring 130.
1973 – In Lillehammer, Norway, Mossad agents kill a waiter whom they mistakenly thought was involved in the 1972 Munich Olympics Massacre.
1976 – Christopher Ewart-Biggs, the British ambassador to the Republic of Ireland, is assassinated by the Provisional IRA.
1977 – The start of the four-day-long Libyan–Egyptian War.
1979 – Jay Silverheels, a Mohawk actor, becomes the first Native American to have a star commemorated in the Hollywood Walk of Fame.
1990 – Taiwan's military police forces mainland Chinese illegal immigrants into sealed holds of a fishing boat Min Ping Yu No. 5540 for repatriation to Fujian, causing 25 people to die from suffocation.
1995 – Third Taiwan Strait Crisis: The People's Liberation Army begins firing missiles into the waters north of Taiwan.
2001 – At the conclusion of a fireworks display on Okura Beach in Akashi, Hyōgo, Japan, 11 people are killed and more than 120 are injured when a pedestrian footbridge connecting the beach to JR Asagiri Station becomes overcrowded and people leaving the event fall down in a domino effect.
2005 – Four attempted bomb attacks by Islamist extremists disrupt part of London's public transport system. 
2008 – Ram Baran Yadav is declared the first President of Nepal.
2010 – President Barack Obama signs the Dodd–Frank Wall Street Reform and Consumer Protection Act.
2011 – NASA's Space Shuttle program ends with the landing of Space Shuttle Atlantis on mission STS-135 at NASA's Kennedy Space Center.
2012 – Erden Eruç completes the first solo human-powered circumnavigation of the world.
2019 – Yuen Long attack or "721 incident" in Hong Kong. Triad members indiscriminately beat civilians returning from protests while police failed to take action.

Births

Pre-1600
 541 – Emperor Wen of Sui, emperor of the Sui Dynasty (d. 604)
1030 – Kyansittha, King of Burma (d. 1112)
1414 – Pope Sixtus IV (d. 1484)
1462 – Queen Jeonghyeon, Korean royal consort (d. 1530)
1476 – Alfonso I d'Este, Duke of Ferrara (d. 1534)
  1476   – Anna Sforza, Italian noble (d. 1497)
1535 – García Hurtado de Mendoza, 5th Marquis of Cañete, Royal Governor of Chile (d. 1609)

1601–1900
1616 – Anna de' Medici, Archduchess of Austria (d. 1676)
1620 – Jean Picard, French astronomer (d. 1682)
1648 – John Graham, 1st Viscount Dundee, Scottish general (d. 1689)
1654 – Pedro Calungsod, Filipino catechist and sacristan; later canonized (d. 1672)
1664 – Matthew Prior, English poet and diplomat, British Ambassador to France (d. 1721)
1693 – Thomas Pelham-Holles, 1st Duke of Newcastle, English politician, Prime Minister of the United Kingdom (d. 1768)
1710 – Paul Möhring, German physician, botanist, and zoologist (d. 1792)
1783 – Charles Tristan, marquis de Montholon, French general (d. 1853)
1808 – Simion Bărnuțiu, Romanian historian, academic, and politician (d. 1864)
1810 – Henri Victor Regnault, French chemist and physicist (d. 1878)
1811 – Robert Mackenzie, Scottish-Australian politician, 3rd Premier of Queensland (d. 1873) 
1816 – Paul Reuter, German-English journalist, founded Reuters (d. 1899)
1858 – Maria Christina of Austria (d. 1929)
  1858   – Lovis Corinth, German painter (d. 1925)
  1858   – Alfred Henry O'Keeffe, New Zealand painter and educator (d. 1941)
1863 – C. Aubrey Smith, English-American cricketer and actor (d. 1948)
1866 – Carlos Schwabe, Swiss Symbolist painter and printmaker (d. 1926)
1870 – Emil Orlík, Czech painter, etcher, and lithographer (d. 1932)
1875 – Charles Gondouin, French rugby player and tug of war competitor (d. 1947)
1880 – Milan Rastislav Štefánik, Slovak astronomer, general, and politician (d. 1919)
1882 – David Burliuk, Ukrainian author and illustrator (d. 1967)
1885 – Jacques Feyder, Belgian actor, director, and screenwriter (d. 1948)
1891 – Julius Saaristo, Finnish javelin thrower and soldier (d. 1969)
1893 – Hans Fallada, German author (d. 1947)
1896 – Sophie Bledsoe Aberle,  Native American anthropologist, physician and nutritionist (d. 1996)
1898 – Sara Carter, American singer-songwriter (d. 1979)
1899 – Hart Crane, American poet (d. 1932)
  1899   – Ernest Hemingway, American novelist, short story writer, and journalist, Nobel Prize laureate (d. 1961)
1900 – Isadora Bennett, American theatre manager and modern dance publicity agent (d. 1980)

1901–present
1903 – Russell Lee, American photographer and journalist (d. 1986)
  1903   – Roy Neuberger, American businessman and financier, co-founded Neuberger Berman (d. 2010)
1908 – Jug McSpaden, American golfer and architect (d. 1996)
1911 – Marshall McLuhan, Canadian author and theorist (d. 1980)
  1911   – Umashankar Joshi, Indian author, poet, and scholar (d. 1988)
1914 – Aleksander Kreek, Estonian shot putter and discus thrower (d. 1977)
1917 – Alan B. Gold, Canadian lawyer and jurist (d. 2005)
1920 – Constant Nieuwenhuys, Dutch painter, sculptor, and illustrator (d. 2005)
  1920   – Isaac Stern, Russian-American violinist and conductor (d. 2001)
  1920   – Jean Daniel, Algerian-French-Jewish journalist and author (d. 2020)
1921 – James Cooke Brown, American sociologist and author (d. 2000)
  1921   – John Horsley, English actor (d. 2014)
  1921   – Vusamazulu Credo Mutwa, Zulu sangoma (d. 2020)
1922 – Kay Starr, American singer (d. 2016)
  1922   – Mollie Sugden, English actress (d. 2009)
1923 – Rudolph A. Marcus, Canadian-American chemist and academic, Nobel Prize laureate
  1923   – Queenie Watts, English actress and singer (d. 1980)
  1924   – Don Knotts, American actor and screenwriter (d. 2006)
1925 – Johnny Peirson, Canadian hockey player (d. 2021)
1926 – Paul Burke, American actor (d. 2009)
  1926   – Norman Jewison, Canadian actor, director, and producer
  1926   – Rahimuddin Khan, Pakistani general and politician, 7th Governor of Balochistan (d. 2022)
  1926   – Bill Pertwee, English actor (d. 2013)
  1926   – Karel Reisz, Czech-English director and producer (d. 2002)
1928 – Sky Low Low, Canadian wrestler (d. 1998)
1929 – Bob Orton, American wrestler (d. 2006)
1930 – Anand Bakshi, Indian poet and songwriter (d. 2002)
  1930   – Helen Merrill, American singer
1931 – Sonny Clark, American pianist and composer (d. 1963)
  1931   – Plas Johnson, American saxophonist 
  1931   – Leon Schidlowsky, Chilean-Israeli painter and composer
1932 – Kaye Stevens, American singer and actress (d. 2011)
1933 – John Gardner, American novelist, essayist, and critic (d. 1982)
1934 – Chandu Borde, Indian cricketer and manager
  1934   – Jonathan Miller, English actor, director, and author (d. 2019)
1935 – Norbert Blüm, German businessman and politician (d. 2020)
  1935   – Moe Drabowsky, Polish-American baseball player and coach (d. 2006)
1937 – Eduard Streltsov, Soviet footballer (d. 1990)
1938 – Les Aspin, American captain and politician, 18th United States Secretary of Defense (d. 1995)
  1938   – Anton Kuerti, Austrian-Canadian pianist, composer, and conductor
  1938   – Janet Reno, American lawyer and politician, 79th United States Attorney General (d. 2016)
1939 – Jamey Aebersold, American saxophonist and educator
  1939   – Kim Fowley, American singer-songwriter, producer, and manager (d. 2015)
  1939   – John Negroponte, English-American diplomat, 23rd United States Ambassador to the United Nations
1942 – Mallikarjun Kharge, Indian politician, 98th President of the Indian National Congress
1943 – Fritz Glatz, Austrian race car driver (d. 2002)
  1943   – Edward Herrmann, American actor (d. 2014)
  1943   – Henry McCullough, Northern Irish guitarist, singer and songwriter (d. 2016)
  1943   – Robert Shrum, American author and political advisor
1944 – John Atta Mills, Ghanaian lawyer and politician, 3rd President of Ghana (d. 2012)
  1944   – Buchi Emecheta, Nigerian author and academic (d. 2017)
  1944   – Paul Wellstone, American academic and politician (d. 2002)
1945 – Wendy Cope, English poet, critic, and educator
  1945   – Geoff Dymock, Australian cricketer
  1945   – Barry Richards, South African cricketer
1946 – Ken Starr, American lawyer and judge, 39th Solicitor General of the United States
  1946   – Timothy Harris, American author, screenwriter and producer
1947 – Chetan Chauhan, Indian cricketer and politician (d. 2020)
1948 – Art Hindle, Canadian actor and director
  1948   – Cat Stevens (Yusuf Islam), English singer-songwriter and guitarist
  1948   – Garry Trudeau, American cartoonist
1949 – Christina Hart, American playwright and actress
  1949   – Hirini Melbourne, New Zealand singer-songwriter and poet (d. 2003)
1950 – Ubaldo Fillol, Argentinian footballer and coach
  1950   – Susan Kramer, Baroness Kramer, English politician, Minister of State for Transport
1951 – Richard Gozney, English politician and diplomat, 30th Lieutenant Governor of the Isle of Man, 139th Governor of Bermuda
  1951   – Robin Williams, American actor and comedian (d. 2014)
1952 – John Barrasso, American physician and politician
  1952   – Ahmad Husni Hanadzlah, Malaysian economist
1953 – Eric Bazilian, American singer-songwriter, multi-instrumentalist, arranger, and producer
  1953   – Jeff Fatt, Australian keyboard player and actor 
  1953   – Bernie Fraser, New Zealand rugby player
  1953   – Brian Talbot, English footballer and manager
1955 – Howie Epstein, American bass player, songwriter, and producer (d. 2003) 
  1955   – Dannel Malloy, American lawyer and politician, 88th Governor of Connecticut
  1955   – Taco, Indonesian-b. Dutch singer and entertainer 
  1955   – Béla Tarr, Hungarian director, producer, and screenwriter
1956 – Michael Connelly, American author
1957 – Stefan Löfven, Swedish trade union leader and politician, 33rd Prime Minister of Sweden
  1957   – Jon Lovitz, American comedian, actor, and producer
1958 – Dave Henderson, American baseball player and sportscaster (d. 2015)
1959 – Gene Miles, Australian rugby league player and sportscaster
  1959   – Reha Muhtar, Turkish journalist
  1959   – Paul Vautin, Australian rugby league player, coach, and sportscaster
1960 – Amar Singh Chamkila, Indian singer-songwriter (d. 1988)
  1960   – Veselin Matić, Serbian basketball player and coach
  1960   – Fritz Walter, German footballer
1961 – Morris Iemma, Australian politician, 40th Premier of New South Wales
  1961   – Jim Martin, American singer-songwriter and guitarist 
1962 – Victor Adebowale, Baron Adebowale, English businessman
1963 – Kevin Poole, English footballer and manager
  1963   – Giant Silva, Brazilian basketball player, mixed martial artist, and wrestler
1964 – Steve Collins, Irish boxer and actor
  1964   – Ross Kemp, English actor and producer
  1964   – Jens Weißflog, German ski jumper and journalist
1965 – Guðni Bergsson, Icelandic footballer and lawyer
  1965   – Mike Bordick, American baseball player, coach, and sportscaster
1966 – Arija Bareikis, American actress
  1966   – Sarah Waters, Welsh author
1968 – Brandi Chastain, American soccer player and sportscaster
  1968   – Aditya Srivastava, Indian actor
  1968   – Lyle Odelein, Canadian ice hockey player
1969 – Godfrey, American comedian and actor
  1969   – Klaus Graf, German race car driver
  1969   – Emerson Hart, American singer-songwriter, guitarist, and producer 
  1969   – Isabell Werth, German equestrian
1970 – Michael Fitzpatrick, American singer-songwriter 
1971 – Emmanuel Bangué, French long jumper
  1971   – Charlotte Gainsbourg, English-French actress and singer
  1971   – Nitzan Shirazi, Israeli footballer and manager (d. 2014)
1972 – Korey Cooper, American singer and guitarist
  1972   – Catherine Ndereba, Kenyan marathon runner
1974 – Geoff Jenkins, American baseball player and coach
  1974   – René Reinumägi, Estonian actor, director, and screenwriter
1975 – Christopher Barzak, American author and educator
1975 – David Dastmalchian, American actor
  1975   – Cara Dillon, Irish singer-songwriter 
  1975   – Ravindra Pushpakumara, Sri Lankan cricketer
  1975   – Mike Sellers, American football player
1976 – Jalmari Helander, Finnish film director and screenwriter
  1976   – Jaime Murray, English actress
1977 – Paul Casey, English golfer
1978 – Justin Bartha, American actor 
  1978   – Anderson da Silva Gibin, Brazilian footballer
  1978   – Josh Hartnett, American actor
  1978   – Julian Huppert, English academic and politician
  1978   – Damian Marley, Jamaican singer-songwriter and producer 
  1978   – Gary Teale, Scottish footballer
1979 – David Carr, American football player
  1979   – Tamika Catchings, American basketball player
  1979   – Luis Ernesto Michel, Mexican footballer 
  1979   – Andriy Voronin, Ukrainian footballer 
1980 – Justin Griffith, American football player
  1980   – Sandra Laoura, French skier 
  1980   – CC Sabathia, American baseball player
  1980   – Yvonne Sampson, Australian journalist and sportscaster
1981 – Paloma Faith, English singer-songwriter and actress
  1981   – Anabelle Langlois, Canadian figure skater
  1981   – Joaquín, Spanish footballer
  1981   – Romeo Santos, American singer-songwriter
  1981   – Stefan Schumacher, German cyclist
1982 – Jason Cram, Australian swimmer
  1982   – Mao Kobayashi, Japanese newscaster and actress (d. 2017)
1984 – Jurrick Juliana, Dutch footballer
  1984   – Liam Ridgewell, English footballer
  1985   – Mati Lember, Estonian footballer
  1985   – Von Wafer, American basketball player
1986 – Anthony Annan, Ghanaian footballer
  1986   – Rebecca Ferguson, American-English singer-songwriter
  1986   – Jason Thompson, American basketball player 
1987 – Bilel Mohsni, French footballer
  1987   – Jesús Zavala, Mexican footballer 
1988 – KB, American rapper 
  1988   – DeAndre Jordan, American basketball player
  1988   – Chris Mitchell, Scottish footballer (d. 2016)
1989 – Marco Fabián, Mexican footballer 
  1989   – Juno Temple, English actress
1990 – Chris Martin, English footballer
  1990   – Jason Roy, English cricketer
  1990   – Erislandy Savón, Cuban amateur heavyweight boxer
  1990   – Franck Elemba, Congolese athlete
1991 – Sara Sampaio, Portuguese model
1992 – Rachael Flatt, American figure skater
1996 – Mikael Ingebrigtsen, Norwegian footballer
1998 – Marie Bouzkova, Czech tennis player
2000 – Erling Haaland, Norwegian footballer

Deaths

Pre-1600
 658 – K'an II, Mayan ruler (b. 588)
 710 – Li Guo'er, princess of the Tang dynasty
   710   – Wei, empress of the Tang Dynasty
   710   – Shangguan Wan'er, Chinese poet (b. 664)
 987 – Geoffrey I, Count of Anjou
1259 – Gojong of Goryeo
1403 – Henry Percy, English soldier (b. 1364)
  1403   – Sir Walter Blount, English soldier, standard-bearer of Henry IV
  1403   – Edmund Stafford, 5th Earl of Stafford, English soldier
1425 – Manuel II Palaiologos, Byzantine emperor (b. 1350)
1552 – Antonio de Mendoza, Spanish politician, 1st Viceroy of New Spain (b. 1495)

1601–1900
1688 – James Butler, 1st Duke of Ormonde, English soldier and politician, Lord Lieutenant of Ireland (b. 1610)
1793 – Antoine Bruni d'Entrecasteaux, French admiral, explorer, and politician (b. 1739)
1796 – Robert Burns, Scottish poet and songwriter (b. 1759)
1798 – François Sébastien Charles Joseph de Croix, Count of Clerfayt, Austrian field marshal (b. 1733)
1798 – Anthony Perry, Irish rebel leader (b. ca. 1760)
1868 – William Bland, Australian surgeon and politician (b. 1789)
1878 – Sam Bass, American outlaw (b. 1851)
1880 – Hiram Walden, American general and politician (b. 1800)
1889 – Nelson Dewey, American lawyer and politician, 1st Governor of Wisconsin (b. 1813)
1899 – Robert G. Ingersoll, American soldier, lawyer, and politician (b. 1833)

1901–present
1920 – Fiammetta Wilson, English astronomer and educator (b. 1864)
1928 – Ellen Terry, English actress (b. 1847)
1932 – Bill Gleason, American baseball player (b. 1858)
1938 – Owen Wister, American lawyer and author (b. 1860)
1941 – Bohdan Lepky, Ukrainian poet and scholar (b. 1872)
1943 – Charley Paddock, American runner and actor (b. 1900)
  1943   – Louis Vauxcelles, French Jewish art critic (b. 1870)
1944 – Claus von Stauffenberg, German soldier (b. 1907)
1946 – Gualberto Villarroel, Bolivian soldier and politician, 45th President of Bolivia (b. 1908)
1948 – Arshile Gorky, Armenian-American painter and illustrator (b. 1904)
1952 – Pedro Lascuráin, Mexican politician, president for 45 minutes on February 13, 1913. (b. 1856)
1966 – Philipp Frank, Austrian-American physicist, mathematician, and philosopher, Vienna Circle member (b. 1884)
1967 – Jimmie Foxx, American baseball player, coach, and manager (b. 1907)
  1967   – Albert Lutuli, South African academic and politician, Nobel Prize laureate (b. 1898)
  1967   – Basil Rathbone, South African-American actor and singer (b. 1892)
1968 – Ruth St. Denis, American dancer and choreographer (b. 1878)
1970 – Mikhail Mikhaylovich Gerasimov, Russian anthropologist and sculptor (b. 1907)
  1970   – Bob Kalsu, American football player and lieutenant (b. 1945)
1972 – Ralph Craig, American sprinter and sailor (b. 1889)
  1972   – Jigme Dorji Wangchuck, Bhutanese king (b. 1928)
1977 – Lee Miller, American model and photographer (b. 1907)
1982 – Dave Garroway, American journalist and actor (b. 1913)
1991 – Paul Warwick, English race car driver (b. 1969)
1994 – Marijac, French author and illustrator (b. 1908)
1997 – Olaf Kopvillem, Estonian-Canadian conductor and composer (b. 1926)
1998 – Alan Shepard, American admiral, pilot, and astronaut (b. 1923)
  1998   – Robert Young, American actor and singer (b. 1907)
2000 – Marc Reisner, American environmentalist and author (b. 1948)
2002 – Esphyr Slobodkina, Russian-American author and illustrator (b. 1908)
2003 – John Davies, English-New Zealand runner and coach (b. 1938)
2004 – Jerry Goldsmith, American composer and conductor (b. 1929)
  2004   – Edward B. Lewis, American geneticist and biologist, Nobel Prize laureate (b. 1918)
2005 – Long John Baldry, English-Canadian singer and actor (b. 1941)
  2005   – Lord Alfred Hayes, English-American wrestler and manager (b. 1928)
2006 – Mako Iwamatsu, Japanese-American actor and singer (b. 1933)
  2006   – Ta Mok, Cambodian soldier and monk (b. 1926)
2007 – Dubravko Škiljan, Croatian linguist and academic (b. 1949)
2008 – Donald Stokes, English businessman (b. 1914)
2010 – Luis Corvalán, Chilean educator and politician (b. 1916)
  2010   – Ralph Houk, American baseball player, coach, and manager (b. 1919)
  2010   – John E. Irving, Canadian businessman (b. 1932)
2012 – Alexander Cockburn, Scottish-American journalist and author (b. 1941)
  2012   – Marie Kruckel, American baseball player (b. 1924)
  2012   – Ali Podrimja, Albanian poet and author (b. 1942)
  2012   – James D. Ramage, American admiral and pilot (b. 1916)
  2012   – Angharad Rees, English-b. Welsh actress (b. 1944)
  2012   – Don Wilson, English cricketer and coach (b. 1937)
2013 – Andrea Antonelli, Italian motorcycle racer (b. 1988)
  2013   – Lourembam Brojeshori Devi, Indian martial artist (b. 1981)
  2013   – Det de Beus, Dutch field hockey player (b. 1958)
  2013   – Luis Fernando Rizo-Salom, Colombian-French composer and educator (b. 1971)
  2013   – Fred Taylor, American football player and coach (b. 1920)
2014 – Louise Abeita, Isleta Pueblo (Native American) writer, poet, and educator (b. 1926)
  2014   – Dan Borislow, American businessman, invented the magicJack (b. 1961)
  2014   – Lettice Curtis, English engineer and pilot (b. 1915)
  2014   – Hans-Peter Kaul, German lawyer and judge (b. 1943)
  2014   – Rilwanu Lukman, Nigerian engineer and politician (b. 1938)
  2014   – Kevin Skinner, New Zealand rugby player and boxer (b. 1927)
2015 – Robert Broberg, Swedish singer-songwriter (b. 1940)
  2015   – E. L. Doctorow, American novelist, short story writer, and playwright (b. 1931)
  2015   – Nicholas Gonzalez, American physician (b. 1947)
  2015   – Czesław Marchaj, Polish-English sailor and academic (b. 1918)
  2015   – Dick Nanninga, Dutch footballer (b. 1949)
2016 – Dennis Green, American football player and coach (b. 1949)
2017 – John Heard, American film and television actor  (b. 1946)
2018 – Alene Duerk, U.S. Navy first female admiral (b. 1920)
2020 – Annie Ross, Scottish-American singer and actress (b. 1930)
  2020   – Andrew Mlangeni, South African political activist (b. 1925)

Holidays and observances
 Christian feast day:
 Albert John Luthuli (Episcopal Church)
 Arbogast
 Barhadbesciabas
 Carlos of Brazil (Brazilian Catholic Apostolic Church)
 Daniel (Catholic Church)
 Lawrence of Brindisi
 Praxedes 
 Victor of Marseilles
 July 21 (Eastern Orthodox liturgics)
 Liberation Day in 1944 (Guam)
 Belgian National Day (Belgium)
 Racial Harmony Day (Singapore)
 Summer Kazanskaya (Russia)

References

External links

 
 
 

Days of the year
July